1982 Paris car bombing may refer to:

April 1982 Paris car bombing
September 1982 Paris car bombing